SHAPE Pad  is a military helipad located in Mons, Belgium, serving Supreme Headquarters Allied Powers Europe (SHAPE). It is operated by the United States Air Force's 424th Air Base Squadron, stationed at Chièvres Air Base.

See also
List of airports in Belgium

References 

Airports in Hainaut (province)